This is a list of songs produced by Tim & Bob.

0-9 
"24 Hours" by Daniel DeBourg
"3 Is The New 2" by Bobby Valentino
"50 Candles" by Boyz II Men
"99 Bottles Of Beer On The Wall" by Nas

A 
"A Melody" by Eternal
"Again" by Brian McKnight
"All I Wanna Do" by The Black Eyed Peas
"All My Love" by Chantay Savage
'All Night" by Donell Jones
"Always Good" by The Isley Brothers
"Are You Ready"  by Bobby Valentino
"Are You Ready For My Love" by Destiny's Child
"As Far As My Eyes Can See" by Daniel DeBourg

B 
"Baby" by Destiny's Child
"Baby, Baby, Baby, Baby" (Remix) by R. Kelly
"Bad Girl" by Jon B.
"Beautiful Sexy Girl" by Vega
"Been Around The World" by Bobby Brown
"Being With You" by Soul for Real
"Best Friend" by Mary J. Blige
"Book Of Love" by Daniel DeBourg

C 
"Call Me" by Tank
"Can I Touch You" by 112
"Can We Talk (Remix)" by Tevin Campbell
"Can You Handle All Of Me" by Coko
"Can't Leave You Alone" by Brian McKnight
"Can't Take It" by Jesse Powell
"Can't Wait" by Donell Jones
"Can't Wait Till Later" by Bobby Valentino
"Caught Up" by 112
"Cherry Pie" by Jennifer Lopez
"Come Closer" by Puff Johnson
"Come Over Girl" by Jersey Ave
"Come Over" by Sandra St. Victor
"Come Touch Me" by Bobby Valentino
"Come See Me Feat Mr. Cheeks" by 112
"Conversate" by Case
"Could've Been You" by Deborah Cox
"Curious" by Bobby Valentino

D 
"Deja Vu by Case
"Destiny" by Dave Hollister
"Do You Remember" by Tank
"Do You Think Of Me" by Willa Ford
"Don't Ask My Neighbor" by JS
"Don't Go" by Deitrick Haddon
"Don't Make Me Wait" by Daniel DeBourg
"Don't Think They Know" by Chris Brown
"Don't Turn Away" by The Isley Brothers
"Don't Wanna Argue" by Donell Jones
"Don't Worry Bout A Thing" by Daniel DeBourg
"Don't Leave Me Lonely" by Damita

 E 
"Even Though" by Case
"Every Time You Come Around" by Bobby V

 F 
"Feelin' You" by Donell Jones
"Flowers" by Daniel DeBourg
"Forever by Bobby Brown
"Forever" by J. Lewis
"For The Longest Time" by 112
"Freaks Come Out" by Bobby V
"Freaky" by Bobby V

 G 
"Get It Up" by TLC
"Get Mine" by Dalvin DeGrate
"Get To Know Me Feat Nas" by Joe
"Get To Know You Better" by Q. Parker of 112
"Ghetto Romance" by Damage
"Girl Got It Going On" by Another Bad Creation
"Give It To You" by Daniel DeBourg
"Give Me A Chance Feat Ludacris" by Bobby Valentino
"Give Me Your Heart" by Bobby Valentino
"Gonna Give You What You Need" by Tyrese
"Gotta Have It" by Elusion

 H 
"Heaven" by Lionel Richie
"Here We Go Again" by Bobby V
"Hold Me" by Earth, Wind & Fire
"Hold On To His Hand" by Puff Johnson
"Hot" by Bobby V
"Hurry" by TGT

 I 
"I Already Know" by Nas
"I'll Be Right There" by Karen Clark Sheard
"I Can't Get Enough" by Bobby Valentino
"I Can't Help It" by Dalvin DeGrate
"I Can't Wait" by Tank
"I Care" by Shanice Wilson
"I Don't Wanna Be Grown Up" by Another Bad Creation
"I Don't Wanna Fight (Remix)" by Tina Turner
"If You Belong To Me" by Lionel Richie
"If You Only Knew" by Mýa
"I'll Be Right There" by Karen Clark Sheard
"I'll Be There" by Shanice Wilson
"I'll Forgive You" by Bobby Valentino
'I'll Give You Anything" by RL
I'll Make Love To You (remix collection) by Boyz II Men
"I'll Wait Right Here" by Jersey Ave
"I, Love" by Jennifer Lopez
"I'm Gonna Be" by Donell Jones
"I'm Gonna Be Feat The Clipse (Remix)" by Donell Jones
"I'm Sorry (My Favorite Girl)" by Dave Hollister
"Impossible" by Musiq Soulchild
"In The Night [Freaks Come Out]" by Bobby Valentino
"In The Mood" by Athena Cage
"In The Morning" by Daniel DeBourg
"It Takes A Man" by Athena Cage
"I Remember" by Boyz II Men
"I Want Cha" by Perfect Gentlemen
"I Want That" by The Isley Brothers
"I Want You Feat Ray J" by 40 Da Great
"I Want You More" by Kevon Edmonds
"I Was Wrong" by Bobby Valentino
"I Wish" by Hilary Duff
"I've Been Waiting" by Tamia

 J 
"Just A Little While" by 112
"Just Because Your Hot" by Coko
"Just Like You" by Mary J. Blige
"Just The Way You Like It" by Deborah Cox

 K 
"Keep It Movin" by MC Lyte
"Khalil Interlude" by Boyz II Men

 L 
"Laurel (My Dream Girl)" by 112
"Leave Me Alone Feat Heavy D" by Athena Cage
"Let Yourself Go" by Daniel DeBourg
"Let's Make Love" by 112
"Let Me Know" by Athena Cage
"Let's Take A Dip" by A Few Good Men
"Let's Stay Together" by Destiny's Child
"Let's Stay Together" by Soul for Real
"Life Is Good" Jamie Foxx
"Long Day" by Dalvin DeGrate
"Love Dream" by Bobby Valentino
'Love Led Me To You by RL
"Love Me Again" by Babyface
"Loving You" by Tamia
"Lost In You" by Tank

 M 
"Made For Me" Daniel DeBourg
"Make You The Only One" by Bobby Valentino
"Malibu Dre" by Dr. Dre
"Mista Valentino" by Bobby Valentino
"Miss Your Kiss" by Tamar Braxton
"Missing You" by Case
"Missing You" by Joe
"My Angel (Never Leave You)" by Bobby Valentino
"My First Kiss" by Another Bad Creation
"My Place" by Bobby Brown
"My World" by Daniel DeBourg

 N 
"Need It" by Tank
"Never Did It Before" by Hev D Heavy D
"Never Lonely" by Bobby Valentino
"Not My Girl" by Dalvin DeGrate
"Not Your Friend" by Case
"Now I'm Gone" by Monica
"Now Or Later" by Musiq Soulchild
"Now That I'm With You" by Jon B.
"Now That We're Done" by 112

 O 
"On The Edge" by Bobby Valentino
"One Girl To Love" by Bobby Valentino
"One More Try" by Another Bad Creation
"Only Human" by Bobby Valentino
"On My Level" by Snoop Dogg
"One Night" by Mýa

 P 
"Pillow" by Willa Ford
'Pillow Talk" by Eternal
"Pretty Woman" by The Isley Brothers

 Q 
"Quick Fast" by Bobby Valentino

 R 
"Rather Be Alone" by Jesse Powell
"Ready For Your Love" by Earth, Wind & Fire
"Really Need You" by Daniel DeBourg
"Religious Love" by R. Kelly
"Remind Me Of Something" (Remix) by R. Kelly
"Reminds Me Of You" by Day26
"Reveal My Heart" by Deitrick Haddon
"Right Here With Me" by JS
"Right There" by Bobby Valentino
"Round and Round" by Monica
"Run Away" by Musiq Soulchild

 S 
"Say" by JS
"Second Chance" by 112
"Sex Games" by Case
"Sexy Girl" by Bobby Valentino
"Shadow" by Daniel DeBourg
"Shake It Up" by Bobby Valentino
"Shorty You Know" by Jersey Ave
"Should I Stay?" by Joe
"Shoulda Been Lovin You (Remix)" by Brian McKnight
"Slowly" by Boyz II Men
"Slow Down" by Bobby Valentino
"Slow Down Feat Nas and Fabolous (Remix)" by Bobby Valentino
"Smile" by 112
"Smile" by Bobby Valentino
"So Amazing" by Boyz II Men
"So Beautiful" by Joe
"So Good To Be In Love" by Deitrick Haddon
"So Into You" by Tamia
"Soon As I Get Home" by Bobby Valentino
"Sorry" by Tyrese
"Special Occasion" by Bobby Valentino
"Supa Star" by Tank
"Sweet Design" by Sia
 T 
"Take Care of Home" by Dave Hollister
"Take Care of Me" by Chanté Moore
"Take It Out On Me" by Athena Cage
"Tears" by Damage
"Tell Me" by Bobby Valentino
"Tell Me" by Destiny's Child
"Tell Me If You Still Care" by Monica
"Tell Me Something Good" by Daniel Debourg
"Tell the World" by Daniel DeBourg
"Tender" by Willa Ford
"Thank God For the Disco" by Willa Ford
"Thank You Lord" by Bobby Valentino
"That's What I Like" by Joe
"They Don't Know" by Jon B.
"They Don't Know" by Chris Brown
"Therapist" by Bobby Valentino
"Think of Me" by Day26
"Thinkin' Bout You" by J. Lewis
"Thong Song" by Sisqó
"Time" by Monica
'Time Will Tell" by David Hollister
"Tonight" by Daniel DeBourg
"Tonight" by Tamar Braxton
"Touch Me" by Bobby V
"Touch My Body" by Jennifer Lopez
"Trying Times" by Boyz II Men
"Turn Off The Lights" by The Game
"Turned Away" by Chantay Savage
"Turn You Out" by Athena Cage

 U 
"Unhappy Without You" by Brian McKnight
"Used To Be My Girl" by Brian McKnight

 V 
"Vibin" by Boyz II Men
"Vibin (Remix Nu Flava)" by Boyz II Men
"Vitamin D" by Ludacris

 W 
"Watching You" by Athena Cage
"Waiting for You" by J. Lewis
"Wake Up" by Tank
"Want You to Know Me" by Bobby Valentino
"Way It Goes" by Athena Cage
"Wet" by Sandra St. Victor
"We've Come Too Far" by Dave Hollister
"When I'm With You" by Kevon Edmonds
"When It Comes to Me" by Chanté Moore
"When The Lights Go Off" by Joe
"Why" by 112
"Why?" by Bobby Valentino
"Wish I Never Met You" by Athena Cage
"Will You Be There" by Boyz II Men
"With You" by Monica
"Without You" by Donell Jones
"Woman In Me" by Monica
"Words" by Támar
"Work It Out" by Babyface

 X 

 Y 
"Ya Game Ain't Game" by Kelly Price
"Yearning" by Puff Johnson
"You" by Athena Cage
"You And Me" by Bobby Valentino
"You Don't Know" by Tamar Braxton
"You Gotta Get Down" by Monica
"You Know" by Boyz II Men
"Your Room" by Tamar Braxton
"You're My Star" by The Isley Brothers
"You're Not Alone" by Bobby Valentino

 Z 

 Album productions (5 or more tracks) 

 1993: 5 A.M. - Self Titled
 1993: Monica - Miss Thang 1994: Boyz II Men - ll 1995: Boyz II Men - Remix Collection 1995: 112 - Self Titled
 2000: Tamar Braxton - Self Titled
 2000: Dalvin DeGrate - Met.a.mor.phic. 2001: Athena Cage - Self Titled
 2001: Case - Open Letter 2001: Jersey Ave - Self Titled
 2002: Daniel DeBourg - Tell the World 2005: Bobby V - Self Titled
 2006: Brian McKnight - Ten 2006: Donell Jones - Journey of a Gemini 2006: Deitrick Haddon - 7 Days 2007: Bobby V - Special Occasion 2008: Damita Haddon - No Looking Back 2009: Bobby V - The Rebirth 2011: Bobby V - Fly on the Wall 2011: Boyz II Men - Twenty''

Production discographies
Discographies of American artists